Gaston Heuet (11 November 1892 – 18 January 1979) was a French long-distance runner. He won a bronze medal at the 1924 Paris Olympics in the cross country team event, together with Henri Lauvaux and Maurice Norland. He won another cross-country bronze medal at the 1919 Inter-Allied Games.

References

1892 births
1979 deaths
Athletes from Buenos Aires
French male long-distance runners
Olympic bronze medalists for France
Athletes (track and field) at the 1912 Summer Olympics
Athletes (track and field) at the 1920 Summer Olympics
Athletes (track and field) at the 1924 Summer Olympics
Olympic athletes of France
Medalists at the 1924 Summer Olympics
Olympic bronze medalists in athletics (track and field)
Olympic cross country runners
19th-century French people
20th-century French people